2004 FH is a micro-asteroid and near-Earth object of the Aten group, approximately 30 meters in diameter, that passed just  above the Earth's surface on 18 March 2004, at 22:08 UTC. It was the 11th closest approach to Earth recorded . The asteroid was first observed on 16 March 2004, by astronomers of the Lincoln Near-Earth Asteroid Research at the Lincoln Laboratory's Experimental Test Site near Socorro, New Mexico.

Orbit and classification 

 is an Aten asteroid. It passed 43,000 km from the Earth on 18 March 2004. For comparison, geostationary satellites orbit Earth at 35,790 kilometers. Despite its small size, it is still the fourth largest asteroid detected coming closer to the Earth than the Moon.

Had this object hit Earth, it would probably have detonated high in the atmosphere. It might have produced a blast measured in hundreds of kilotons of TNT, but may not have produced any effect on the ground. It could also have been an Earth-grazing fireball if it had been much closer but not close enough to impact.

Two weeks later another asteroid approached even closer, which was smaller, and a few years later , which was closer in size passed by at similar distance.

Physical characteristics 

 is an assumed stony S-type asteroid.

Rotation period 

Lightcurve analysis gave a rotation period of 0.0504 hours (3.02 minutes) with a brightness amplitude of 1.16 and 0.75 magnitude, respectively.

This makes this object a fast rotator, currently among the Top 100 known to exist. The photometric observations also revealed, that  is a tumbler with a non-principal axis rotation.

Diameter and albedo 

has been estimated to measure approximately 30 meters (100 feet) in diameter. The Collaborative Asteroid Lightcurve Link assumes a standard albedo for stony asteroids of 0.20 and calculates a diameter of 24 meters based on an absolute magnitude of 25.7.

Notes

References

External links 

 MPEC 2004-F24
 Images of 2004 FH at Klet
 Asteroid Lightcurve Database (LCDB), query form (info )
 Asteroids and comets rotation curves, CdR – Observatoire de Genève, Raoul Behrend
 
 
 

Minor planet object articles (unnumbered)

20040318
20040316